Tori-Bossito  is a town, arrondissement, and commune in the Atlantique Department of southern Benin. The commune covers an area of 263 square kilometres and as of 2002 had a population of 44,569 people.

Tori is home to a constituent monarchy.

References
 

Communes of Benin
Populated places in the Atlantique Department
Arrondissements of Benin